Bilal Uçar (born 6 January 1969) is a Turkish politician who has been Deputy Minister of Justice since January 2016. He served as a Member of Parliament for Denizli from Justice and Development Party (AKP) between 2011 and 2015.

References 

1969 births
Living people
Justice and Development Party (Turkey) politicians
Istanbul University Faculty of Law alumni
Members of the 24th Parliament of Turkey
Members of the 25th Parliament of Turkey
Turkish Sunni Muslims
Deputy ministers of Turkey
Deputies of Denizli
People from Acıpayam